The Saab (formerly Ericsson Microwave Systems AB) Giraffe Radar is a family of land and naval two- or three-dimensional G/H-band (4 to 8 GHz) passive electronically scanned array radar-based surveillance and air defense command and control systems tailored for operations with medium- and Short Range Air Defense (SHORAD) missile or gun systems or for use as gap-fillers in a larger air defense system. The radar gets its name from the distinctive folding mast which when deployed allows the radar to see over nearby terrain features such as trees, extending its effective range against low-level air targets. The first systems were produced in 1977. By 2007, some 450 units of all types are reported as having been delivered.

Serbian Military Technical Institute purchased a licence for Giraffe 75 and producing a new model with several modifications. Domestic Serbia designation is M85 "Žirafa" on chassis of FAP 2026.

Saab Electronic Defence Systems (EDS) in May 2014 unveiled two new classes of active electronically scanned array (AESA) radar—three land-based systems (Giraffe 1X, Giraffe 4A and Giraffe 8A) and two naval variants (Sea Giraffe 1X and Sea Giraffe 4A) in X- and S-band frequencies—to complement its existing surface radar portfolio.

Description
Giraffe is a family of G/H (formerly C-band) frequency agile, low to medium altitude pulse doppler air search radars and combat control centers which can be used in mobile or static short to medium range air defense applications. Giraffe is designed to detect low-altitude, low cross-section aircraft targets in conditions of severe clutter and electronic countermeasures. When equipped as an air-defense command center Giraffe provides an air picture to each firing battery using man portable radio communication.

Giraffe uses Agile Multi-Beam (AMB), which includes an integrated Command, control and communication (C3) system. This enables Giraffe to act as the command and control center in an air defense system, it can also be integrated into a sensor net for greater coverage. It is normally housed in a single 6m long shelter mounted on an all-terrain vehicle for high mobility. Additionally the shelter can be augmented with Nuclear, Biological and Chemical protection and light layers of armor to protect against small arms and fragmentation threats.

Variants

Passive electronically-scanned array

Giraffe 40
This is a short-range ( instrumented) air defense radar with command and control capability. It employs a folding antenna mast that extends to a height of  when deployed and can be integrated with an Interrogation Friend or Foe (IFF) capability. In Swedish service the radar is designated PS-70 and PS-701 and provides target data to RBS-70 SHORADS missiles and 40 mm Bofors guns. A more powerful version with a 60 kW transmitter is known commercially as Super Giraffe and in Swedish service as PS-707. These radars are no longer marketed.

Giraffe 50AT
This is the model used in the Norwegian NALLADS air defense system which combines the radar and RBS-70 missiles with 20 mm anti-aircraft guns to provide low-level air defense for the combat brigades of the Norwegian army. The Command and Control system features fully automatic track initiation, target tracking, target identification (IFF), target classification and designation, hovering helicopter detection threat evaluation and handling of "pop-up" targets. It can also exchange data with Giraffe 75 or AMB systems as part of a larger network.

Giraffe 75
This features a  antenna mast and is normally carried on a 6x6 5-ton cross-country truck which carries the radar and command and control shelter. An optional add-on unit extends the radars coastal defense capabilities. In Swedish service the radar is designated PS-90. In the Greek Air Force Giraffe 75 is used in combination with Contraves (now Rheinmetall defense) Skyguard/Sparrow fire control systems. 1 Giraffe typically controls 2 Skyguard systems each with 2 twin 35 mm GDF-005 guns and 2 Sparrow surface-to-air missile launchers.

Giraffe S
Optimized as a mobile radar for un-manned remote-controlled applications as a "gap-filler" in air defense early warning systems concentrating on small, low-flying targets over a long distance. It can also be employed as a coastal surveillance radar where targets are small surface vessels and sea-skimming missiles or aircraft.

Giraffe AMB
Data rate is 1-scan per-second. Its maintained pulse density suppresses high cluttering in adverse weather conditions. Ultra-low antenna side-lobes combined with pulse-to-pulse and burst-to-burst frequency agility provides some resistance to jamming. As in previous Giraffe radars automatic hovering helicopter detection is provided as is a rocket, artillery and mortar locating function, allowing the radar to detect incoming rounds and give 20 seconds or more of warning before impact. Giraffe AMB is the principal sensor of the Swedish RBS 23 BAMSE air defense missile system but is available for many other applications. The Giraffe AMB can be delivered with ground surveillance options fitted.. A skilled crew can deploy the radar in around 10 minutes and recover it in around 6 minutes.

ARTE 740
This is a coastal defense radar based on the Giraffe 75 antenna and Giraffe AMB processing system optimized for surface and low-altitude coverage for the Swedish Amphibious Forces (formerly the Coastal Artillery). It is mounted on a MOWAG Piranha 10x10 armored vehicle. 6 systems are in service.

Sea Giraffe AMB
Saab's Sea Giraffe AMB is the naval variant of their Giraffe radar with 3D AMB technology. Also, it is specialized for rapidly detecting small, fast moving targets at all altitudes and small surface targets in severe clutter. Sea Giraffe AMB is installed on the Republic of Singapore Navy's upgraded  and US Navy's  of littoral combat ships, and has the designation AN/SPS 77 V(1) for LCS 2 and 4, and AN/SPS 77 V(2) for LCS 6 and higher. It has also been chosen for the Royal Canadian Navy's new Protecteur-class Joint Support Ships.
Its roles include:
Air surveillance and tracking
Surface surveillance and tracking
Target identification for weapon systems
High-resolution splash spotting

Active electronically-scanned array 
Saab Electronic Defence Systems (EDS) in May 2014 unveiled two new classes of active electronically scanned array (AESA) radar—three land-based systems (Giraffe 1X, Giraffe 4A and Giraffe 8A) and two naval variants (Sea Giraffe 1X and Sea Giraffe 4A).

Giraffe 8A
At the top end of the range is the Giraffe 8A, a long-range IEEE S-band (NATO E/F) 3D sensor that can be produced in fixed, transportable and fully mobile configurations.

Intended primarily for remote operation as part of an integrated air defence network, Giraffe 8A can also be operated locally.

Giraffe 8A produces 15 stacked beams to provide elevation coverage from ground level to more than 65°. It can operate in a continuous 360° scan mode, rotating mechanically at 24rpm, or can be steered electronically across an operator-specified sector of 40° to 100°. More than 1,000 air defence tracks can be maintained, and the system also has anti-ballistic missile capability, in which case more than 100 tracks can be followed.

Saab has paid special attention to Giraffe 8A's electronic counter-countermeasures properties. The radar generates very low sidelobes and incorporates sophisticated frequency agility in pulse-to-pulse, burst-to-burst and scan-to-scan regimes. It also switches and staggers pulse repetition frequency and transmits random jitter to further confuse countermeasures. It automatically selects the least jammed frequencies and can transmit intermittently or randomly. The radar offers a passive detection and tracking capability against jammers.

Giraffe 4A
While the Giraffe 8A occupies the high end of the family, Saab has introduced new radars in the medium-range category in the form of Giraffe 4A and Sea Giraffe 4A for naval use. Employing similar S-band technology to the larger radar, Giraffe 4A offers true 3D multirole capability, combining the air defence and weapon locating tasks in a single unit. Able to be airlifted in a single C-130 load, Giraffe 4A can be deployed by two people in less than 10 minutes. It can operate as a standalone.

The Swedish armed forces designation for the G4A radar is PM24.

Giraffe 1X
To complete its new line-up, Saab has introduced two short-range radars, Giraffe 1X and Sea Giraffe 1X. Working in the IEEE X-band (NATO I-band), Giraffe 1X is intended primarily as a highly mobile radar that can work with very short-range air defence systems in the battlefield or at sea.

The radar has a sense-and-warn function and can be optionally configured for weapon location.

Users

: Sea Giraffe AMB G-band 3-D surveillance radar will equip MEKO A-200 frigates for the Algerian National Navy
: Sea Giraffe installed on  ships and ordered as a ground-based system.
: In use by the Marine Corps since 1989, in the 50AT version, with a BV-206D tractor. To be replaced by the Saber M60.
: Sea Giraffe is used on s.
 5 systems in service, but has production licence and technology transfer for the system acquired during and after Croatian homeland war. 
: Giraffe AMB - 5 mobile truck mounted units used by Estonian Air Defence Battalion.
: Jantronic J-1000 target acquisition systems with Ericsson Giraffe Mk IV radars on a XA-182 Pasi APC. Sea Giraffe installed on four s. A combination of Sea Giraffe 4A and Sea Giraffe 1X fixed-face radars on the four  ice-capable corvettes of the Squadron 2020 program
: Giraffe AMB in use by the French Air Force.
: Indonesian Army
: Irish Army, Giraffe Mk IV on BV 206.

Giraffe 40 used by Malaysian Army.
: Norwegian Army, Giraffe Mk IV on BV 206.

: Sea Giraffe AMB radars to be installed on the s
: M-85 Žirafa upgraded and modernized variant based on purchased licence by Military Technical Institute
: Giraffe S and AMB in service with the Republic of Singapore Air Force's air-defence radar network; Sea Giraffe AMB aboard the Republic of Singapore Navy's s.

: used by South African national defence force
: Used by both the Army and Navy historically in large numbers and with most versions starting with the PS-70 and today the Giraffe AMB both on land and in the s. The new 4A radar is planned to be acquired for the army's anti aircraft battalions when they switch from HAWK to Patriot missile systems.
: Giraffe S, Sea Giraffe AMB and Sea Giraffe 4A used in Royal Thai Navy
: UAE Navy  also use Sea Giraffe
: The British Army and Royal Air Force jointly operate the G-AMB radar in 49 (Inkerman) Battery Royal Artillery.
:  Giraffe 75  Under control of the Aerospace Defense Command FANB.

See also
ARTHUR

References
Citations

Bibliography

External links

Older official website for Giraffe radar
Official website for Giraffe AMB
Official website for Sea Giraffe AMB
maritime-index.com
radartutorial.eu 
naval-technology.com

Ground radars
Military radars of Sweden
Military equipment introduced in the 1970s